Tautvydas Lydeka (born 13 October 1983) is a Lithuanian former professional basketball player.

Professional career
Lydeka started his professional career, in LKKA Rusteda Kaunas (LKAL) 2003. Then he signed with Dnipro Dnipropetrovsk, where he played 2 seasons. In 2007–08 season he started in Hanzevast Capitals Groningen, but in October he moved to Olympias Patras. He played there until second half of the season when he moved to Igokea Partizan Aleksandrovac. In 2008 he moved to Italy where he play in Pallacanestro Cantù and Scavolini Pesaro. In 2012–13 season he played in Krasnye Krylia Samara. Eventually after 8 years aboard he debuted in LKL where he played in Lietuvos rytas Vilnius. In 2014–15 season he started in Lietkabelis Panevežys, but in October he moved to Trefl Sopot. In 2015–16 season he sign with San Lorenzo de Almagro Buenos Aires, becoming the first Lithuanian player in Argentina, but in December both parties agree to terminate contract, he signed with Consultinvest Pesaro where he played until end of the season. On 19 June 2016, he signed with Dinamo Sassari.

In February 2018, Lydeka returned to Italy, after his half-season with Limoges, and he signed with New Basket Brindisi.

On August 31, 2019, he has signed 2-month contract with VL Pesaro of the Lega Basket Serie A.

On March 10, 2020, he has signed with Caen Basket Calvados of the French Pro B.

References

1983 births
Living people
BC Dnipro players
BC Dzūkija players
BC Krasnye Krylia players
BC Lietkabelis players
BC Rytas players
Caen Basket Calvados players
Centers (basketball)
Dinamo Sassari players
Donar (basketball club) players
KK Igokea players
Lega Basket Serie A players
Limoges CSP players
Lithuanian men's basketball players
New Basket Brindisi players
Olympias Patras B.C. players
Pallacanestro Cantù players
San Lorenzo de Almagro (basketball) players
SC Rasta Vechta players
Trefl Sopot players
Victoria Libertas Pallacanestro players
People from Druskininkai